The framing effect is a cognitive bias where people decide on options based on whether the options are presented with positive or negative connotations; e.g. as a loss or as a gain.

  Gain and loss are defined in the scenario as descriptions of outcomes (e.g., lives lost or saved, disease patients treated and not treated, etc.).

Prospect theory posits that a loss is more significant than the equivalent gain, that a sure gain (certainty effect and pseudocertainty effect) is favored over a probabilistic gain, and that a probabilistic loss is preferred to a definite loss. One of the dangers of framing effects is that people are often provided with options within the context of only one of the two frames.

The concept helps to develop an understanding of frame analysis within social movements, and also in the formation of political opinion where spin plays a large role in political opinion polls that are framed to encourage a response beneficial to the organization that has commissioned the poll. It has been suggested that the use of the technique is discrediting political polls themselves. The effect is reduced, or even eliminated, if ample credible information is provided to people.

Research
Amos Tversky and Daniel Kahneman explored how different phrasing affected participants' responses to a choice in a hypothetical life and death situation in 1981.

Participants were asked to choose between two treatments for 600 people affected by a deadly disease. Treatment A was predicted to result in 400 deaths, whereas treatment B had a 33% chance that no one would die but a 66% chance that everyone would die. This choice was then presented to participants either with positive framing, i.e. how many people would live, or with negative framing, i.e. how many people would die.

Treatment A was chosen by 72% of participants when it was presented with positive framing ("saves 200 lives") dropping to 22% when the same choice was presented with negative framing ("400 people will die").

This effect has been shown in other contexts:
 93% of PhD students registered early when a penalty fee for late registration was emphasized, but only 67% did so when this was presented as a discount for earlier registration.
 62% of people disagreed with allowing "public condemnation of democracy", but only 46% of people agreed that it was right to "forbid public condemnation of democracy".
 More people will support an economic policy if the employment rate is emphasised than when the associated unemployment rates is highlighted.
 It has been argued that pretrial detention may increase a defendant's willingness to accept a plea bargain, since imprisonment, rather than freedom, will be his baseline, and pleading guilty will be viewed as an event that will cause his earlier release rather than as an event that will put him in prison.

Extensionality violation
In logic, extensionality requires "two formulas which have the same truth-value under any truth-assignments to be mutually substitutable salva veritate in a sentence that contains one of these formulas." Put simply, objects that have the same external properties are equal. This principle, applied to decision making, suggests that making a decision in a problem should not be affected by how the problem is described. For example, varied descriptions of the same decision problem should not give rise to different decisions, due to the extensionality principle. If judgments are made on the basis of irrelevant information as described, that is called an extensionality violation.

Developmental factors

The framing effect has consistently been shown to be one of the largest biases in decision making. In general, susceptibility to framing effects increases with age. Age difference factors are particularly important when considering health care and financial decisions.

However, the framing effect seems to disappear when encountering it in a foreign (non-native) language. One explanation of this disappearance is that a non-native language provides greater cognitive and emotional distance than one's native tongue. A foreign language is also processed less automatically than a native tongue. This leads to more deliberation, which can affect decision making, resulting in decisions that are more systematic.

Childhood and adolescence
Framing effects in decision-making become stronger as children age. This is partially because qualitative reasoning increases with age. While preschoolers are more likely to make decisions based on quantitative properties, such as probability of an outcome, elementary schoolers and adolescents become progressively more likely to reason qualitatively, opting for a sure option in a gain frame and a risky option in a loss frame regardless of probabilities. The increase in qualitative thinking is related to an increase in "gist based" thinking that occurs over a lifetime.

However, qualitative reasoning, and thus susceptibility to framing effects, is still not as strong in adolescents as in adults, and adolescents are more likely than adults to choose the risky option under both the gain and loss frames of a given scenario. One explanation for adolescent tendencies toward risky choices is that they lack real-world experience with negative consequences, and thus over-rely on conscious evaluation of risks and benefits, focusing on specific information and details or quantitative analysis. This reduces influence of framing effects and leads to greater consistency across frames of a given scenario. Children between the ages of 10 and 12 are more likely to take risks and show framing effects, while younger children only considered the quantitative differences between the two options presented.

Young adulthood
Younger adults are more likely than older adults to be enticed by risk-taking when presented with loss frame trials.

In multiple studies of undergraduate students, researchers have found that students are more likely to prefer options framed positively. For example, they are more likely to enjoy meat labeled 75% lean meat as opposed to 25% fat, or use condoms advertised as being 95% effective as opposed to having a 5% risk of failure.

Young adults are especially susceptible to framing effects when presented with an ill-defined problem in which there is no correct answer and individuals must arbitrarily determine what information they consider relevant. For example, undergraduate students are more willing to purchase an item such as a movie ticket after losing an amount equivalent to the item's cost than after losing the item itself.

Older adulthood
The framing effect is claimed to be greater in older adults than in younger adults or adolescents. This claim may be a result of enhanced negativity bias, though some sources claim that the negativity bias actually decreases with age.

Another possible cause is that older adults have fewer cognitive resources available to them and are more likely to default to less cognitively demanding strategies when faced with a decision. They tend to rely on easily accessible information, or frames, regardless of whether that information is relevant to making the decision in question. Several studies have shown that younger adults will make less biased decisions than older adults because they base their choices on interpretations of patterns of events and can better employ decision making strategies that require cognitive resources like working-memory skills. Older adults, on the other hand, make choices based on immediate reactions to gains and losses.

Older adults' lack of cognitive resources, such as flexibility in decision making strategies, may cause older adults to be influenced by emotional frames more so than younger adults or adolescents. In addition, as individuals age, they make decisions more quickly than their younger counterparts. It is significant that, when prompted to do so, older adults will often make a less biased decision with reevaluation of their original choice.

The increase in framing effects among older adults has important implications, especially in medical contexts. Older adults are influenced heavily by the inclusion or exclusion of extraneous details, meaning they are likely to make serious medical decisions based on how doctors frame the two options rather than the qualitative differences between the options, causing older adults to inappropriately form their choices.

When considering cancer treatments, framing can shift older adults' focus from short- to long-term survival under a negative and positive frame, respectively. When presented with treatment descriptions described in positive, negative, or neutral terms, older adults are significantly more likely to agree to a treatment when it is positively described than they are to agree to the same treatment when it is described neutrally or negatively. Additionally, framing often leads to inconsistency in choice: a change in description qualities after an initial choice is made can cause older adults to revoke their initial decision in favor of an alternative option. Older adults also remember positively framed statements more accurately than negatively framed statements. This has been demonstrated by evaluating older adults' recall of statements in pamphlets about health care issues.

See also

 Choice architecture
 Fuzzy-trace theory
 Is the glass half empty or half full?
 List of cognitive biases
 Mental accounting
 Metaphorical framing
 Motivated reasoning
 Overton window
 Prospect theory
 Status quo bias
 Thinking, Fast and Slow

References

Sources

Further reading

External links
 The Framing Effect - It's not what you say but how you say it

Cognitive biases
Prospect theory